Piacenza Calcio did not manage to renew their stay in Serie A, in the club's debut season at the top level of Italian football. The performance from the team was not too poor however, considering it was only a point from the 14th place that would have kept Piacenza up.

Squad

Goalkeepers
  Massimo Taibi
  Rino Gandini

Defenders
  Cleto Polonia
  Stefano Maccoppi
  Settimio Lucci
  Antonio Carannante
  Massimo Brioschi
  Roberto Chiti
  Andrea Di Cintio

Midfielders
  Luigi Erbaggio
  Francesco Turrini
  Pasquale Suppa
  Giorgio Papais
  Daniele Moretti
  Agostino Iacobelli
  Giuseppe Ferazzoli
  Gianpietro Piovani

Attackers
  Marco Ferrante
  Antonio De Vitis
  Simone Inzaghi

Competitions

Serie A

League table

Matches

Top scorers
  Gianpietro Piovani 6
  Francesco Turrini 5
  Giorgio Papais 4 (3)
  Marco Ferrante 4
  Agostino Iacobelli 3

Coppa Italia

Second round

Eightfinals

Quarterfinals

References

Sources
  RSSSF - Italy 1993/94

Piacenza Calcio 1919 seasons
Piacenza